Peziza succosa is a species of apothecial fungus belonging to the family Pezizaceae. It grows in woods in Europe, Iceland, Israel, China, Argentina, and the United States. In the United States, this type of cup fungi may also be found on decaying deciduous wood. It is inedible.

References

Further reading

External links

Peziza succosa at GBIF

Fungi described in 1841
Fungi of Europe
Inedible fungi
Pezizaceae
Taxa named by Miles Joseph Berkeley
Fungi of Iceland
Fungi of China
Fungi of South America
Fungi of North America